Shirley Wang is a Chinese-American philanthropist, businessperson, and CEO. She is the co-founder of The Walter and Shirley Wang Foundation, a philanthropic organization. She is also the founder and CEO of Plastpro, Inc., a leading fiberglass door manufacturer founded in Los Angeles in 1994.

Early life and education 
Wang earned her Bachelor of Arts in communications and international business at University of California-Los Angeles in 1990 and her M.B.A. at Columbia University in 1993. From 1990 to 1991, Wang worked as an account executive for J. Walter Thompson Advertising, where she managed client accounts including Borden Foods and Chivas Regal. She then worked as an account executive for Citigroup from 1993 to 1994.

Career
In 1994, Wang founded Plastpro, Inc., a millwork products importer, manufacturer, and distributor that specializes in fiberglass doors.

In 2005, Plastpro, Inc. opened the world's first fully automated millwork manufacturing facility, a 300,000-square-foot factory in Ashtabula, Ohio in the United States. The plant can produce up to one million finished doors per year. 
In 2021, Dry Construction awarded Plastpro, Inc with its "Company of the Year" award.

Philanthropy 
Wang's philanthropy centers on programs and initiatives aiming to foster understanding of and communication between the United States and China. This includes the donations both of fiberglass doors to over 100 homes for Habitat for Humanity of Los Angeles and of three technology labs to United States public schools in Ashtabula County, Ohio.

In July 2016, Wang was appointed the first Asian-American woman to chair the UCLA Foundation Board, and has served on the UCLA Board of Directors since 2008. She is likewise a member of the executive committee for the Centennial Campaign for UCLA, a UCLA Foundation board that raises money for student scholarships and fellowships, which raised $5.49 billion and counting. Wang has served on numerous other boards including the Boards of Directors of both Facing History and Ourselves and the Preferred Bank (PFBC). In 2019, Wang's company, Plastpro, Inc., donated $100,000 toward an endowment at Glenbeigh Hospital for addiction.

Alongside her husband Walter, Wang is co-founder of the Walter and Shirley Wang Foundation. The foundation has supported various philanthropic initiatives in the realms of education, poverty reduction, assistance to domestic violence victims, Asian immigrant welfare, cancer research, and AIDS research and advocacy. The couple are members of the Committee of 100 (C-100). Wang and her husband are trustees of the U.S. Olympic Committee and also serve on the Board of the Los Angeles Olympic Committee 2028.

Shirley and Walter Wang donated to UCLA to establish an endowment to support both students from middle-income families and students studying abroad. At UCLA, the foundation endowed the first academic chair on U.S.-China relations and Chinese American studies in the United States, as well as a chair for Drug Discovery at the university. One of Shirley Wang's first major gifts to UCLA, her alma mater, was an endowment in partnership with the China Institute to send teachers to China, promoting intercultural communications. The couple also funded Wang Hall at the Harvard-Westlake School in Los Angeles, providing the lead donation for the renovation of the Harvard Westlake Humanities and Art Building. Wang serves as the chair of the Education Committee and is a member of the Board of Trustees of Harvard-Westlake School.

The Wangs were prominent supporters of the Drug Enforcement Administration Foundation and helped bring the DEA Museum to the California Science Center in Los Angeles to educate the public on illegal drugs and trafficking. The Wangs also established an endowed chair at the Cedar Sinai Medical Center for Pediatric Surgery to fund novel research in pediatric surgery, as well as assist underprivileged children in need of surgery. The couple funded six staff positions at the Asian Pacific American Legal Center to aid in providing legal services to immigrant domestic-violence survivors. The Walter and Shirley Wang Foundation donated $250,000 to found an Outward Bound Center for underprivileged youth in New York, New York.

In partnership with her husband, Wang funded documentaries on crucial social issues in China and Chinese-American history. The documentary The Blood of Yingzhou District, which centers on the AIDS epidemic in China, won the 2007 Academy Award for Best Documentary (Short Subject). The Warriors of Qiugang, which was nominated for an Academy Award for Best Documentary (Short Subject) in 2010, resulted in a $30 million investment from the Chinese government to clean up the toxic waste around the waterway where the film takes place. Additionally, the Wangs are the first and most prominent sponsors of the Emmy-nominated PBS documentary Becoming American: The Chinese Experience by Bill Moyers. The three-part, six-hour documentary examines immigration, citizenship, and what it means to be Chinese-American.

In the wake of the COVID-19 global pandemic, Plastpro, Inc. and JM Eagle donated surgical masks to Ohio facilities local to the Plastpro, Inc. factory. The Wangs donated $1 million to the Mayor's Fund of Los Angeles, as well as supplies for the creation of face shields for use at Cedars Sinai Medical Center and the Innovation Lab at UCLA.

In October 2020, Wang was elected to her alma mater Columbia University's board of trustees – a role in which she actively supports both the renovation of undergraduate students common areas and the construction of the new home for the Columbia Business School on the Manhattanville campus. With their two children currently attending Columbia College, Wang also sits on the college's Parent Leadership Council.

In March 2022, Wang and her husband donated $10 million to Columbia to enhance undergraduate social life in John Jay Hall, Wallach Hall, and Alfred Lerner Hall. She also donated $1 million to fund a passageway linking the two new buildings on Columbia Business School's new campus in Manhattanville.

Recognition

Wang and her husband have been recognized by the China AIDS Initiative in 2006, the Museum of Chinese in America in New York in 2007, and the Los Angeles Chinatown Public Safety Association in 2008, and were honored in 2010 by Asian Americans Advancing Justice with its 2010 Public Service Award. The pair also received the 2010 Asian Pacific American Legal Center Public Service Award. The Wangs were bestowed the Anti-Defamation League's Humanitarian Award in 2018.

Wang personally received the Ellis Island Medal of Honor in 2011 on behalf of her philanthropic work. She received the Media Advocate Award from the Asian Business Association in 2011. Wang was later awarded the Blue Cloud Award from the China Institute in 2015 and the Philanthropy Award from the Asia Society in 2016.

See also
List of Columbia University alumni

References

Further reading

Living people
American chief executives
American philanthropists
Year of birth missing (living people)
University of California, Los Angeles alumni
Columbia Business School alumni
American people of Chinese descent